, nicknamed "Thanos" is a Japanese professional baseball infielder for the Yokohama DeNA BayStars of Nippon Professional Baseball (NPB).

References 

1994 births
Living people
Japanese baseball players
Nippon Professional Baseball infielders
Yokohama DeNA BayStars players
Baseball people from Okayama Prefecture